Andrey Viktorovich Krylov (born 10 April 1984) is a Russian swimmer. He competed in the individual 400 m medley event at the 2008 Summer Olympics and set a national record, but did not reach the finals.

References

1984 births
Living people
Swimmers at the 2008 Summer Olympics
Russian male swimmers
Olympic swimmers of Russia